Harold Lloyd Griggs (August 24, 1928 – May 10, 2005) was an American professional baseball player, a right-handed pitcher who appeared in three full seasons and part of another between  and  for the Washington Senators of Major League Baseball.

Griggs was a workhorse as a minor league pitcher, logging over 200 innings pitched for his first six seasons (1950–1955) in professional baseball, including stints with Washington's Charlotte Hornets and Chattanooga Lookouts minor league affiliates.  In the Majors, he was a starting pitcher in 45 of his 105 total appearances. Pitching for second-division and cellar-dwelling Washington teams, he compiled a poor .188 winning percentage, winning six games and losing 26, and surrendering 372 hits in 347 innings pitched. He also walked more batters than he struck out, 209 to 172.

According to a 1993 Sports Illustrated article, Griggs was married on a Hickory, North Carolina, pitching mound before a minor league game in 1952. Asked why, he said: "I couldn't hit, so there was no sense getting married at home plate."
Griggs enjoyed the night life of a Major League player, telling a Washington teammate, "I'm only going to be here once on this earth, and I'm really going to live it up."

Griggs pitched professionally into the 1963 season before retiring from the game, and died at age 76 in Tucson, Arizona.

References

External links
Career statistics, from Baseball Reference

1928 births
2005 deaths
Baseball players from Georgia (U.S. state)
Charleston Senators players
Charlotte Hornets (baseball) players
Chattanooga Lookouts players
Hawaii Islanders players
Hickory Rebels players
Major League Baseball pitchers
Newton-Conover Twins players
People from Floyd County, Georgia
Syracuse Chiefs players
Washington Senators (1901–1960) players